The Moorddrift Monument (lit. Murder Ford Monument) is a provincial heritage site  in Potgietersrus in the Limpopo province of South Africa.

In 1993 it was described in the Government Gazette as

References
 South African Heritage Resource Agency database

Monuments and memorials in South Africa
Buildings and structures in Limpopo